Llechgynfarwy (or Llechcynfarwy) is a hamlet in the community of Tref Alaw, Ynys Môn, Wales, which is 136.5 miles (219.7 km) from Cardiff and 219.7 miles (353.5 km) from London. It is the location of St Cynfarwy's Church.

See also 
 List of localities in Wales by population

References 

Villages in Anglesey